Hacienda Beer Company is a microbrewery in the U.S. state of Wisconsin. It is strongly associated with the Door County Brewing Company (DCBC), from which Hacienda was created in 2018. , Hacienda brews their beer in DCBC facilities in Baileys Harbor and operates a taproom on Milwaukee's Upper East Side. Their beer is served both there and at DCBC in Baileys Harbor.

History 
Hacienda originated in the family-run Door County Brewing Company, which was founded by John and Angie McMahon beginning in 2012 as a way of luring their sons Danny and Ben back to their Door County, Wisconsin, roots. In 2017, Danny, Ben, and three other DCBC employees founded Hacienda, giving an intentional branding for experimental and non-conventional beers—what a local Door County magazine called "bolder flavors". According to a later Hacienda general manager:

Hacienda launched in February 2018, having waited for the equipment needed to finalize a new 15-barrel brewery and taproom in Baileys Harbor.

In November 2018, Hacienda announced that had signed a lease with Milwaukee developer Josh Jeffers to open a taproom of their own on the city's Upper East Side. The space was formerly used for G-Daddy's BBC Bar and Grill, but was gutted inside in preparation for the new operators. Beer for the new location would be brewed in DCBC's 15-barrel brewery.

The Milwaukee taproom opened in June 2019, and becoming part of a wave of new openings that reinvigorated the surrounding district and cemented a shift in the area's patronage from college students to young well-heeled professionals. In November of the same year, the brewery added two lines of roasted coffee for sale, and overhauled their food menu. In 2021, the McMahons departed DCBC and Hacienda.

In late 2022, a new management team at Hacienda announced a brand "re-introduction" with the goal of making it less intimidating to casual visitors. Changes included a new exterior sign to highlight the taproom's kitchen offerings, another menu shake-up, and the addition of hard seltzers.

Milwaukee location 

Hacienda's  Milwaukee taproom is located in a 1913 building at 2018 E. North Ave. The interior, gutted prior to Hacienda moving in, was designed by Milwaukee-based 360 Degrees. They aimed to create "a blend of casual, whimsical, yet hardworking, sophisticated and timeless qualities."

Primary colors in the new taproom included blue, green, and orange. The builders left cream city brick walls deliberately exposed while large hanging orbs to light the space. Seats on the Prospect Ave. side of the building were upholstered with Madras fabric. The way to the bathrooms is marked by a highly visible neon sign reading "flush vibes".

Beer 
Hacienda focuses on juicy IPAs, pale ales, and sour beers. At its opening, it served around twelve beers, including:
 Everything Eventually, a New England-style pale ale and its best-selling beer
 Does Anyone Work Around Here?, an unfiltered lager
 There is No Other Way, a gin-barrel aged farmhouse ale

See also 
 List of breweries in Wisconsin

Notes

References 

Beer brewing companies based in Wisconsin 
Food and drink companies established in 2018
American companies established in 2018